ThingamaBob is science entertainment television series. The series premiered in the United States on the H2 on January 18, 2014. The show follows inventor Bob Partington around as he attempts to build various contraptions for local businesses in Brooklyn.  Ten episodes have been scheduled to be produced by TGroup Productions in association with 1stAveMachine.

Plot 
Bob Partington is an inventor from Brooklyn, New York. In each episode, Bob receives a new box of items which are related to American history in a way. Bob is required to use these items to reinvent three unique inventions. The show follows Bob around as he comes up with ideas to use the items for and eventually constructs fully functioning contraptions. The show is accommodated with historical facts regarding the items Bob has to use.

Episodes

See also 
 Rube Goldberg machine
 H2

References

External links 
 

H2 (A&E networks) original programming
2014 American television series debuts
2014 American television series endings
2010s American documentary television series
English-language television shows